Zarafshan is a town in north-west Tajikistan. It is situated on the northern slope of the Gissar Range. It is located in Ayni District in Sughd Region. The town has a total population of 2,400 (Jan. 2020).

See also 

 Zeravshan (river)
 Zarafshan Mountains

References

External links
 
Satellite map

Populated places in Sughd Region
Jamoats of Tajikistan